Jody David VeDepo is an American professional mixed martial artist currently competing in the Middleweight division. A professional competitor since 2005, he has formerly competed for the UFC and Bellator.

Background
Born and raised in the small town of Columbus Junction, just outside of Iowa City, Iowa, Vedepo was a standout wrestler at Iowa City High School, winning 105 overall matches during four seasons. After high school, Vedepo began training in mixed martial arts (MMA).

Mixed martial arts career

Early career
Vedepo made his professional MMA debut in November 2005.  He went undefeated at 6–0 in the first two and a half years of his career.

Ultimate Fighting Championship
Vedepo was invited to compete on The Ultimate Fighter 7 but declined for unknown reasons.

Vedepo made his debut for the UFC on September 17, 2008 against Alessio Sakara at UFC Fight Night 15.  He lost the fight via KO in the first round.

For his second fight, Vedepo faced Rob Kimmons at UFC Fight Night 18 on April 1, 2009. He lost the fight via submission in the first round.

Vedepo was expected to face Gerald Harris on August 28, 2010 at UFC 118, replacing an injured Alessio Sakara.  On August 18, it was announced that the Vedepo/Harris bout had been scrapped from the card.

Independent promotions
Following his release from the UFC, Vedepo fought at ZT Fight Night: Heavyweights Collide, where he fought two weight classes higher at Heavyweight and on only a few days notice.  He faced Oli Thompson, winning via TKO (punches) in the second round.  He was expected to fight Rob Broughton to crown the tournament winner but Vedepo broke his hand in his semifinals bout against Thompson, which forced him out of the finals.

Bellator MMA
Vedepo is notable for inventing the modified shin choke, also known as the Vedepo Choke, he used this submission to win his debut bout in Bellator, at the event Bellator 80. In his next appearance, Vedepo squared off against fellow veteran Louis Taylor at Bellator 84. Vedepo was knocked out with a short right hook while he had Taylor in half guard.

Vedepo then fought longtime veteran Eddie Larea on August 10, 2013, headlining for a regional promotion in Cedar Rapids, Iowa. In an upset, Vedepo was defeated via first-round TKO.

Vedeop then faced fellow UFC veteran Kendall Grove on October 18, 2013 at Bellator 104. In a hard-fought bout, Vedepo lost via unanimous decision.

Vedepo faced Ben Crowder at Bellator 117 on April 18, 2014. He defeated Crowder via a verbal submission, as Crowder sustained a leg injury.

Vedepo then faced Cortez Coleman at Bellator 121 on June 6, 2014 and won via decision in a closely contested battle.

Vedepo faced Davin Clark at Bellator 129 on October 17, 2014. He won via TKO in the third round.

Vedepo will make a quick return to the Bellator cage as he steps in as a replacement for an injured Tom DeBlass against Muhammed Lawal on November 15, 2014 at Bellator 131. He lost the fight via TKO in the third round.

On December 4, 2014 Bellator MMA announced they released Vedepo from the promotion after he allegedly assaulted a police officer in Iowa. The incident came less than two weeks after his loss at Bellator 131, involving a reportedly-intoxicated Vedepo head butting a police officer in the chest and being tasered ineffectively, as it reportedly took several officers to subdue him. The officer Vedepo head butted was hospitalized with a back injury.

Independent promotions
Vedepo made his return on June 11, 2016, in a rematch with Eddie Larrea. Vedepo avenged his prior loss, winning via rear-naked choke submission in the first round. Vedepo most recently fought on December 29, 2017, losing via technical submission in the first round.

Personal life
Vedepo has daughters and twin sons.

Mixed martial arts record

|-
| Win
|align=center| 20-10
|Virgil Knight
|Submission (rear-naked choke)
|Elite Fight League 7
|
|align=center|2
|align=center|0:48
|Cedar Rapids, Iowa, United States
|Middleweight bout.
|-
| Win
|align=center| 19–10
|Darrius Flowers
|Submission (keylock)
|Elite Fight League 6
|
|align=center|1
|align=center|3:55
|Cedar Rapids, Iowa, United States
|Catchweight (195 lb) bout.
|-
| Loss
|align=center| 18–10
|Daniel Vizcaya
|Technical Submission (rear-naked choke)
|RCC 14: Revolution Combat Championships 14
|
|align=center|1
|align=center|3:49
|Cedar Rapids, Iowa, United States
|For the RCC Light Heavyweight Championship.
|-
| Win
|align=center| 18–9
|Eddie Larrea
|Submission (rear-naked choke)
|RCC: Revolution Cage Combat
|
|align=center|1
|align=center|3:33
|Iowa City, Iowa, United States
|
|-
| Loss
|align=center| 17–9
|Muhammed Lawal
|TKO (punches)
|Bellator 131
|
|align=center|3
|align=center|0:39
|San Diego, California, United States
|
|-
| Win
|align=center| 17–8
|Davin Clark
|TKO (punches)
|Bellator 129
|
|align=center|3
|align=center|2:27
|Council Bluffs, Iowa, United States
|
|-
|Win
|align=center| 16–8
|Cortez Coleman
|Decision (majority)
|Bellator 121
|
|align=center|3
|align=center|5:00
|Thackerville, Oklahoma, United States
|
|-
| Win
|align=center| 15–8
|Ben Crowder
|Technical Submission (leg injury)
|Bellator 117
|
|align=center|1
|align=center|0:48
|Council Bluffs, Iowa, United States
|
|-
| Loss
|align=center| 14–8
| Kendall Grove
| Decision (unanimous)
| Bellator 104
| 
|align=center| 3
|align=center| 5:00
| Cedar Rapids, Iowa, United States
| 
|-
| Loss
|align=center| 14–7
| Eddie Larrea
| TKO (punches)
| Triple A MMA 2
| 
|align=center| 1
|align=center| 0:45
| Cedar Rapids, Iowa, United States
|
|- 
| Loss
|align=center| 14–6
| Louis Taylor
| KO (punches)
| Bellator 84
| 
|align=center| 1
|align=center| 4:12
| Hammond, Indiana, United States
|
|- 
| Win 
|align=center| 14–5
| Mike Bernhard
| Submission (shin choke)
| Bellator 80
| 
|align=center| 1 
|align=center| 3:26
| Hollywood, Florida, United States
|
|- 
| Loss 
|align=center| 13–5
| Jason Buck
| Submission (rear-naked choke)
| Pinnacle Combat MMA 10
| 
|align=center| 1 
|align=center| 0:43
| Dubuque, Iowa, United States
|For the vacant Pinnacle Combat Middleweight Championship.
|-
| Win
|align=center| 13–4
| Kenneth Allen
| Submission (rear-naked choke)
| Extreme Challenge 202
| 
|align=center| 1
|align=center| 2:17
|Bettendorf, Iowa, United States
| 
|-
| Loss
|align=center| 12–4
| Dmitry Samoilov
| Decision (unanimous)
| League S-70: Russia vs. Brazil
| 
|align=center| 2
|align=center| 5:00
|Sochi, Krasnodar Krai, Russia
| 
|-
| Win
|align=center| 12–3
| Dennis Reed
| Submission (armbar)
| Revolution Combat Championships 11: Cocked and Loaded
| 
|align=center| 1
|align=center| 1:31
|Columbus Junction, Iowa, United States
| 
|-
| Win
|align=center| 11–3
| Oli Thompson
| TKO (punches)
| ZT Fight Night: Heavyweights Collide
| 
|align=center| 2
|align=center| 1:24
|Hove, East Sussex, England
|ZT Fight Night Heavyweight Tournament Semifinal.
|-
| Win
|align=center| 10–3
| Miguel Bernard
| Submission (armbar)
| ZT Fight Night: Heavyweights Collide
| 
|align=center| 1
|align=center| 0:33
|Hove, East Sussex, England
|ZT Fight Night Heavyweight Tournament Quarterfinal.
|-
| Win
|align=center| 9–3
| Webster Farris
| KO (punch)
| Adrenaline MMA IV
| 
|align=center| 1
|align=center| 0:14
|Council Bluffs, Iowa, United States
| 
|-
| Loss
|align=center| 8–3
| Rob Kimmons
| Technical submission (guillotine choke)
| UFC Fight Night 18
| 
|align=center| 1
|align=center| 1:54
|Nashville, Tennessee, United States
| 
|-
| Loss
|align=center| 8–2
| Alessio Sakara
| KO (head kick)
| UFC Fight Night 15
| 
|align=center| 1
|align=center| 1:27
|Omaha, Nebraska, United States
| 
|-
| Win
|align=center| 8–1
| Brian Green
| Submission (verbal)
| MCC 14: Pride or Fate
| 
|align=center| 3
|align=center| 4:25
|Urbandale, Iowa, United States
| 
|-
| Win
|align=center| 7–1
| Karl Kelly
| Submission (keylock)
| Pinnacle Combat: MMA
| 
|align=center| 1
|align=center| 1:44
|Dubuque, Iowa, United States
| 
|-
| Loss
|align=center| 6–1
| Mario Miranda
| TKO (punches)
| Carnage at the Creek 2
| 
|align=center| 3
|align=center| 2:38
|Shelton, Washington, United States
| 
|-
| Win
|align=center| 6–0
| Rob Smith
| TKO (knees)
| XFO 22: Xtreme Fighting Organization
| 
|align=center| 2
|align=center| 1:17
|Crystal Lake, Illinois, United States
| 
|-
| Win
|align=center| 5–0
| Chris Powers
| Submission (kimura)
| Mainstream MMA: Vengeance
| 
|align=center| 1
|align=center| 2:55
|Cedar Rapids, Iowa, United States
| 
|-
| Win
|align=center| 4–0
| Todd Carney
| TKO (strikes)
| Extreme Challenge 83
| 
|align=center| 1
|align=center| 4:34
|Riverside, Iowa, United States
| 
|-
| Win
|align=center| 3–0
| Jeremy Norwood
| KO (punch)
| Rwevolution Combat Championships Vol. 1: The Doctor is Out
| 
|align=center| 1
|align=center| 1:35
|West Liberty, Iowa, United States
| 
|-
| Win
|align=center| 2–0
| Joe Winterfeldt
|align=center| N/A
| Title Fighting Championships 1
| 
|align=center| 1
|align=center| N/A
|Des Moines, Iowa, United States
| 
|-
| Win
|align=center| 1–0
| Jesse Lennox
| Decision (unanimous)
| Mainstream MMA 1: Inception
| 
|align=center| 3
|align=center| 5:00
|Cedar Rapids, Iowa, United States
|

See also 
List of male mixed martial artists
List of Bellator MMA alumni

References

External links 
 
 

Living people
American male mixed martial artists
Mixed martial artists from Iowa
Middleweight mixed martial artists
Light heavyweight mixed martial artists
Heavyweight mixed martial artists
Mixed martial artists utilizing wrestling
Sportspeople from Iowa City, Iowa
1983 births
Ultimate Fighting Championship male fighters
American male sport wrestlers
Amateur wrestlers